Putney Pier is a pier on the River Thames at Putney, in the London Borough of Wandsworth.

Location 

The pier is 24.94m long and is located off Putney Embankment near the Star & Garter pub and Thai Square restaurant, west of Putney Bridge on the south bank of the River Thames.

The start of the Men's and Women's University Boat Race Championship Course, and the end of various non-university races from October to March, are close to the pier.

History 
The pier was built in the late 19th century and has a lattice ironwork gangway.

Livett's Launches own and manage the pier, in 2013 there was concern within the local rowing community about their redevelopment of the pier.

The Tideway Tunnel's Putney Embankment Foreshore access site is close to the pier and is expected to be closed by 2025, leaving a viewing platform for the boat races.

Public services 
The RB6 Uber Boat by Thames Clippers runs a commuter service from the Pier in mornings and early evenings, the pier has a ticket reader for contactless or oyster card payment.

Private services 
Viscount Cruises, Thames Luxury Charters, and Capital Pleasure Boats offer private charters from Putney Pier.

Connections to other public transport 
The pier is served by Transport for London buses 22, 265, 378 and 485 which stop at the Putney Pier stop on the Lower Richmond Road.  Putney Bridge tube station (District line) is a 7-minute walk over the bridge, Putney railway station (Southwestern Railway) is a 13-minute walk.  The Putney pier Santander Cycles docking station is a 1-minute walk across the Lower Richmond road.

References

External links
 Putney Pier - Transport for London
 Putney Pier - Uber Boat by Thames Clippers
 Livett's Putney Pier

London River Services
Infrastructure in London
Rowing venues in the United Kingdom
Piers in London
Geography of the London Borough of Wandsworth
Transport in the London Borough of Wandsworth
Putney